The Gerasimov Institute of Cinematography (meaning
All-Russian State Institute of Cinematography named after S. A. Gerasimov), a.k.a. VGIK, is a film school in Moscow, Russia.

History

The institute was founded in 1919 by the film director Vladimir Gardin as the Moscow Film School and is the oldest film school in the world. From 1934 to 1991 the film school was known as the All-Union State Institute of Cinematography.

Film directors who have taught at the institute include Lev Kuleshov, Marlen Khutsiev, Aleksey Batalov, Sergei Eisenstein, Mikhail Romm and Vsevolod Pudovkin.  Alumni include Sergei Bondarchuk, Elem Klimov, Sergei Parajanov, Alexander Sokurov and Andrei Tarkovsky.

Since 1986, the school has been named after the film director and actor Sergei Gerasimov. A full member of the international CILECT network of film schools, the Institute became a university in 2008.

The founding of the institute was authorized by V. I. Lenin in 1919. Its work in the early years was hampered by the shortage of film stock. It has had an illustrious history as one of the oldest film schools in existence; many great film directors have taught at the institute. During the period of the Soviet Union it was a requirement of the state to attend VGIK in order to be allowed to direct a film. . More recently, its alumni were drawn both from the USSR (Soviet Union) and from other socialist and other countries, though it was a requirement for students to first learn Russian prior to attending. It is among the few film schools which offer scriptwriting courses.

Notable alumni
Notable alumni include:

Tengiz Abuladze
Sitora Alieva
Dhimitër Anagnosti
Natalya Andrejchenko
Anders Banke
Siddiq Barmak
Aimée Beekman
Vladimir Beekman
Sergei Bondarchuk
Lucian Bratu
Valentin Chernykh
Sofiko Chiaureli
Revaz Chkheidze
Grigory Chukhray
Yuri Chulyukin
Souleymane Cissé
Frank Daniel
Georgi Djulgerov
Maciej Drygas
Dimitri Devyatkin
Nikolai Ekk
Natalya Fateyeva
Yan Frid
Aleksandr Fyodorov
Leonid Gaidai
Aleksei Alekseivich German
Marina Goldovskaya
Anatoli Golovnya
Stanislav Govorukhin
Zheng Guo'en
Lyudmila Gurchenko
Iris Gusner
Alexander Gutman
Jerzy Hoffman
Rustam Ibragimbekov
Otar Iosseliani
Roman Karmen
Shapi Kaziev
Edmond Keosayan
Ilya Khrzhanovsky
Marlen Khutsiev
Naum Kleiman
Elem Klimov
Andrei Konchalovsky
Alim Kouliev
Larisa Kronberg
Lev Kulidzhanov
Eldar Kuliev
Tamila Koulieva-Karantinaki
Savva Kulish
Leida Laius
Anton Lapenko
Pavel Lebeshev
Jay Leyda
Việt Linh
Sergei Loznitsa
Oleg Makara
Mohammad Malas
Vladimir Menshov
Rachel Messerer
Márta Mészáros
Nikita Mikhalkov
Aleksandr Misharin
Alexander Mitta
Kira Muratova
Vladimir Nakhabtsev
Rodion Nakhapetov
Khodzha Kuli Narliyev
Georgy Natanson
Rufina Nifontova
Mikko Niskanen
Rashid Nugmanov
Arsha Ovanesova
Yuri Ozerov
Sergei Parajanov
Aleksandr Petrov
Juris Podnieks
Gennadi Poloka
Galina Polskikh
Ami Priyono
Vsevolod Pudovkin
Andres Puustusmaa
Irma Raush
Eduard Rozovsky
Eldar Ryazanov
Samson Samsonov
Abderrahmane Sissako
Mikhail Schweitzer
Karen Shakhnazarov
Giorgi Shengelaia
Eldar Shengelaya
Larisa Shepitko
Vasily Shukshin
Sjumandjaja
Lyubov Sokolova
Aleksandr Sokurov
Elena Solovey
Sergey Solovyov
Sjumandjaja
Andrei Tarkovsky
Viktoriya Tokareva
Alexei Uchitel
Mikhail Vartanov
Natalya Vavilova
Luz Valdez
Oleg Vidov
Gheorghe Vodă
Eduard Volodarsky
Konrad Wolf
Francheska Yarbusova
Vadim Yusov
Vytautas Žalakevičius

Faculty
In 2015-2016 the Institute featured the following faculties: 

Directing Faculty
Acting Faculty
Arts Faculty
Filming Faculty
Animation and Multimedia Faculty
Scripting and Film Studies Faculty
Production and Economics Faculty
Inter-faculty departments and labs:
Department of History and Philosophy
Department of Cultural Theory, History and Esthetics
Laboratory of Film Drama
Laboratory of Painting and Drawing
Laboratory of Arts
Laboratory of International Film History
Laboratory of Classical and Stop-motion Animation
Laboratory of Computer Graphics and Multimedia

References

External links
 vgik.info, Gerasimov Institute of Cinematography's official website (in Russian language)
 vgik.livejournal.com, Gerasimov Institute of Cinematography's student community (in Russian language)

 
Film organizations in the Soviet Union
Educational institutions established in 1919
Universities and institutes established in the Soviet Union
Universities in Moscow
1919 establishments in Russia
Film schools in Russia